Mecon may refer to:

 Truncated octahedron or mecon, an Archimedean solid
 Master of Economics (M.Econ.), a postgraduate master's degree
 MECON (company), an Indian steel company
 Mecon, a figure in Greek mythology

See also
 Mekon (disambiguation)